"In My Room" is a song written by Brian Wilson and Gary Usher for the American rock band the Beach Boys. It was released on their 1963 album Surfer Girl. It was also released as the B-side of the "Be True to Your School" single. The single peaked at number 23 in the U.S. (the A-side peaked at number 6, for a two-sided top-40) and was eventually inducted into the Grammy Hall of Fame in 1999. "In My Room" was ranked number 212 on Rolling Stone's list of The 500 Greatest Songs of All Time.

Writing the song 
The song is written in the key of B major and features a flat VII A major chord.

Gary Usher explained that

Gary Usher (who co-wrote the song with Brian Wilson) further describes that "Brian was always saying that his room was his whole world." Brian seconds this opinion: "I had a room, and I thought of it as my kingdom. And I wrote that song, very definitely, that you're not afraid when you're in your room. It's absolutely true."

In 1990, Brian wrote,

Demo version and final release 
The 1993 CD box set, Good Vibrations: Thirty Years of The Beach Boys, contains an early version of "In My Room" with a number of differences from the eventual official release. It is unclear if this fully developed demo was recorded the same day as the final version on July 16, 1963. The tune features six Beach Boys: both Al Jardine (on vocals) and David Marks (whose strumming guitar backs up Carl Wilson's picked solo notes) are present.  This was the last of eight charting songs to include Marks until nearly 50 years later, performing on 2012's That's Why God Made the Radio.

The demo begins with an intro that was later scrapped, and launches into the first verse with full group vocals, unlike the finished recording. There, as previously mentioned, the single brings in Brian Wilson's voice first, then his brother Carl Wilson and finally Dennis Wilson. Then the final version adds, in the title/hook, Al Jardine, and Mike Love's bass voicing which both join in to complete the vocal mix.

The Beach Boys also recorded a German version of the song under the title Ganz allein, with lyrics written by a former German girlfriend of Mike Love's . The German version was first released on the 1983 album Rarities, and later as a bonus track on the 2001 CD re-release of the Surfer Girl album.

Reception
Cash Box described it as "a tearful, oh-so-smooth ballad."

Charts 
"In My Room" remained on the Billboard Hot 100 for 11 weeks, peaking at #23 in 1963. In the UPI (United Press International) weekly survey it was #17 nationally, upheld by its widespread success across the country wherever it was treated as an A-side:
 #1 in Boston and Seattle
 #2 San Francisco;
Top 10 Washington DC, Houston, Minneapolis, Pittsburgh, Columbus.

Rolling Stone magazine named it #212 on its list of greatest songs of all-time.

Recognition and later versions 
David Crosby of The Byrds and Crosby, Stills & Nash (and Young) admitted to being an admirer of the song, quoting In My Room' was the defining point for me. When I heard it, I thought 'I give up—I can't do that—I'll never be able to do that. He recorded it as a trio with Jimmy Webb and Carly Simon on "An All-Star Tribute to Brian Wilson (2001)." 
A remake by Gary Usher's own band, Sagittarius, peaked at #86 in 1969.
Wilson Phillips included their version of the song as the closing track to their 2004 studio album California. This version includes vocals by Brian Wilson, the father of group members Carnie and Wendy Wilson.
Grant Lee Buffalo performed a cover of "In My Room" for an episode of the American sitcom Friends in 1995, the song was included in the official soundtrack album of the show.
Tammy Wynette's last recording was "In My Room". It was featured as the last track on the album Tammy Wynette Remembered released in September 1998 on Asylum Records.
Jacob Collier's cover of "In My Room" was the title track to his debut album released in 2016.

Performers 
Partial credits sourced from Craig Slowinski.
Brian Wilson – lead vocals, organ, bass
Mike Love – backing vocals
Carl Wilson – backing vocals, guitar
Dennis Wilson – backing vocals, drums
Al Jardine – backing vocals
David Marks – guitar
Maureen Love – harp
Hal Blaine – triangle, wood block or temple block

References

External links
Greg Panfile's Musical Analysis of "In My Room"

1963 songs
1963 singles
The Beach Boys songs
Grammy Hall of Fame Award recipients
Songs written by Gary Usher
Songs written by Brian Wilson
Song recordings produced by Brian Wilson
Capitol Records singles
Doo-wop songs